Shannon Danise Higgins-Cirovski (born February 20, 1968) is a former U.S. soccer midfielder who earned fifty-one caps with the United States between 1987 and 1991.  She was a member of the U.S. team at the 1991 FIFA Women's World Cup and is a member of the National Soccer Hall of Fame.

High school and college
Higgins grew up in Kent, Washington, where she attended Mount Rainier High School.  She graduated from high school in 1986 and entered the University of North Carolina at Chapel Hill that fall, playing on the women's soccer team from 1986 to 1989.  During those four seasons, UNC-Chapel Hill won four consecutive NCAA Championships.  Higgins scored the game-winning goal in the last three championship games.  She was a two-time first team All American (1988 and 1989) and the recipient of numerous awards including the 1988 and 1989 Soccer America Player of the Year, 1989 ISAA Player of the Year and the 1989 Hermann Trophy.  She won the Honda Sports Award as the nations's top soccer player at the end of the 1989–90 season. In 2000, she was named to the Soccer America College Team of the Century.  Higgins graduated from UNC in 1990 with a bachelor's degree in industrial relations.

National team
Higgins earned fifty-one caps with the United States between 1987 and 1991.  Her greatest achievement came in the 1991 FIFA Women's World Cup when her playmaking skills were a central part of the U.S.'s championship run.  In the 2–1 final, Higgins assisted on both of Michelle Akers goals.

Coach
Following her graduation from UNC in 1990, Higgins-Cirovski was hired as an assistant coach to the George Washington University women's soccer team.  In 1992, she was elevated to the position of head coach, taking the team to a 69–59–11 record before resigning in 1997.  She was inducted into the university's Athletic Hall of Fame in 2003. In 1998, Higgins-Cirovski served as the head coach of the U.S. U-18 women's national team.  On January 13, 1999, she was hired as the University of Maryland, College Park women's soccer team, a position she held until resigning in 2006.  She had a 62–51–10 (.549) record over her six seasons.  Her husband, Sasho Cirovski, coaches the school's men's soccer team.

Broadcaster
In 2001, Higgins-Cirovski was a color commentator for the television broadcasts of the Washington Freedom of the WUSA.

She was inducted into the National Soccer Hall of Fame in 2002.  That year, the Atlantic Coast Conference named her to its list of the Top 50 ACC Athletes in the first fifty years of the conference's existence.

References

External links
 National Soccer Hall of Fame
 Where Are They Now?
 University of Maryland

1968 births
Living people
United States women's international soccer players
North Carolina Tar Heels women's soccer players
American women's soccer coaches
George Washington Colonials women's soccer coaches
Maryland Terrapins women's soccer coaches
1991 FIFA Women's World Cup players
Sportspeople from Kent, Washington
Soccer players from Washington (state)
FIFA Women's World Cup-winning players
American women's soccer players
National Soccer Hall of Fame members
Women's association football midfielders
Hermann Trophy women's winners